Homoeosoma quinquepunctella is a species of snout moth in the genus Homoeosoma. It was described by Warren in 1914. It is found in South Africa.

References

Endemic moths of South Africa
Moths described in 1914
Phycitini